Armenians in United Arab Emirates refers to ethnic Armenians living in the United Arab Emirates. They number around 5,000.

The Armenians live mainly in Dubai, Sharjah and Abu Dhabi

Migration history
Many Armenians originating from Lebanon, Syria and other Arab countries were attracted by the economic opportunities provided by the UAE, and they came to the UAE for jobs. Although there are no clear statistics and their numbers vary, over time their number has increased to around 3,000.
Recently there are also economic migrants coming from Armenia and Armenians from Russia.

Religion

The majority of the Armenians in the United Arab Emirates are Armenian Apostolics (Orthodox Armenians) belonging to the Armenian Apostolic Church and under the jurisdiction of the Holy See of Cilicia.

The Catholicossate of the Great House of Cilicia (also known as the Holy See of Cilicia) has established the "Diocese of Kuwait and the Arabian Gulf Countries" headquartered in Kuwait, but also serving the Armenians in the Persian Gulf including UAE.

The Armenian Catholicossate, with the authorization and financial support of the Sharjah Emirate, established the St. Gregory the Illuminator Church (in Armenian Sourp Krikor Lousavoritch Hye Arakelagan Yegeghetsi) in Al Yarmook, Sharjah, thus becoming the first ever Armenian church established in the United Arab Emirates. 

The Catholicos Representative of the Diocese is Bishop Mesrob Sarkissian who also represents the Armenian population of Qatar. Reverend Aram Dekermendjian is the parish Priest of the Armenian Community in Sharjah and in the capital of Abu Dhabi, Bishop Vache Balekjian.

See also 
Armenia–United Arab Emirates relations
Armenian diaspora
Expatriates in the United Arab Emirates
Armenians in the Middle East

References

External links
Azad Hye Armenian Middle Eastern Portal

United Arab Emirates
United Arab Emirates
United Arab Emirates
Ethnic groups in the United Arab Emirates